Felipe Arcos Pérez (born 17 May 2000) is an Uruguayan rugby union player, currently playing for Súper Liga Americana de Rugby side Peñarol. His preferred position is centre.

Personal
Arcos Pérez attended The British Schools of Montevideo.

Professional career
Arcos Pérez signed for Súper Liga Americana de Rugby side Peñarol ahead of the 2021 Súper Liga Americana de Rugby season, before re-signing ahead of 2022 season. 

He has also represented the Uruguay national rugby union team, as well as the Uruguay national rugby sevens team.

References

External links
itsrugby.co.uk Profile

2000 births
Living people
Uruguayan rugby union players
Rugby union centres
Peñarol Rugby players
People educated at The British Schools of Montevideo